Séverine Eraud (born 24 February 1995) is a French racing cyclist, who currently rides for UCI Women's Continental Team . She became junior world champion in the time trial at the 2013 UCI Road World Championships as well as European champion in the time trial at the 2013 European Road Championships.

Major results

2012
 1st  Time trial, National Junior Road Championships
2013
 UCI Junior Road World Championships
1st  Time trial
7th Road race
 UEC European Junior Road Championships
1st  Time trial
2nd  Road race
 National Junior Road Championships
1st  Time trial
2nd Road race
 1st Chrono des Nations (junior)
2014
 2nd  Time trial, UEC European Under-23 Road Championships
 3rd Time trial, National Under-23 Road Championships
2015
 National Under-23 Road Championships
2nd Road race
2nd Time trial
 5th Overall Tour Cycliste Féminin International de l'Ardèche
 6th Overall Tour de Feminin-O cenu Českého Švýcarska
1st  Young rider classification
2016
 National Under-23 Road Championships
1st  Time trial
3rd Road race
 UEC European Road Championships
3rd  Under-23 road race
9th Under-23 time trial
10th Road race
 9th Chrono des Nations
2017
 National Road Championships
1st  Under-23 time trial
2nd Time trial
 5th Time trial, UEC European Under-23 Road Championships
 7th Overall Tour de Feminin-O cenu Českého Švýcarska
1st  Young rider classification
2018
 1st Flanders Ladies Classic
 3rd Time trial, National Road Championships
2019
 1st  Time trial, Military World Games
 1st  Time trial, National Road Championships
 5th Overall Tour de Feminin-O cenu Českého Švýcarska
 6th Overall Tour de Bretagne Féminin
2020
 7th Vuelta a la Comunitat Valenciana Feminas
2022
 5th La Classique Morbihan

References

External links

1995 births
Living people
French female cyclists
People from Châteaubriant
Cyclists at the 2015 European Games
European Games competitors for France
Cyclists from Loire-Atlantique
21st-century French women